Johannes Wilhelm "Hans" Goldschmidt (18 January 1861 – 21 May 1923) was a German chemist notable as the discoverer of the Thermite reaction. He was also co-owner of the Chemische Fabrik Th. Goldschmidt, as of 1911 Th. Goldschmidt AG (later to become part of Evonik Industries) and its most important chemist.  The reaction, also called the Goldschmidt process, is used for thermite welding, often used to join railway tracks. Thermites have also been used in metal refining, disabling munitions, and in incendiary weapons. Some thermite-like mixtures are used as pyrotechnic initiators in fireworks.

His grave is preserved in the Protestant Friedhof I der Jerusalems- und Neuen Kirchengemeinde (Cemetery No. I of the congregations of Jerusalem's Church and New Church) in Berlin-Kreuzberg, south of Hallesches Tor.

Biography
He was born in Berlin on 18 January 1861. He was a student of Robert Bunsen. His father, Theodor Goldschmidt, was the founder of the chemical company Chemische Fabrik Th. Goldschmidt which eventually became part of the modern company Degussa, and Hans and his brother Karl Hering managed this company for many years.

He is principally noted as the co-inventor of sodium amalgam and the initial patent holder of the thermite reaction. The thermite (or aluminothermic) reaction is one in which aluminium metal is oxidized by an oxide of another metal, usually iron oxide, producing great heat in the process. Goldschmidt was originally interested in producing very pure metals by avoiding the use of carbon in smelting, but he soon realized the value in welding, a process known as thermic welding.  It is also used in incendiary devices. This process is sometimes called the "Goldschmidt reaction" or "Goldschmidt process", because he furthered its development and patented it in 1895. He also went on to publish an extensive paper on it in 1898.

He died on 21 May 1923.

Legacy
His grave is preserved in the Protestant Friedhof I der Jerusalems- und Neuen Kirchengemeinde (Cemetery No. I of the congregations of Jerusalem's Church and New Church) in Berlin-Kreuzberg, south of Hallesches Tor.

See also 
Thermite welding

References

Further reading
 Named Things in Chemical Industry

External links
 

1861 births
1923 deaths
20th-century German chemists
Scientists from Berlin
Humboldt University of Berlin alumni
19th-century German chemists